The Kallankari Islands are two islands, Maakalla and Ulkokalla, located on the Bothnian Bay in North Ostrobothnia, Finland.

Approximately 4,000—5,000 tourists visit Maakalla and its fishing village every year.

Self-government 
In addition to their nature, the specialty of the Kallankari is the self-government of the islands, whose "supreme decision-making and judicial power" is exercised by the Assembly. Self-government dates back to the time of Swedish rule and is based on the Hamina Order, enacted by King Adolf Frederick in 1771, which entrusts the reins to the fishermen. The meeting will be held annually on the 25th July closest to Sunday. The National Land Survey has stated that the islands are owned by the state of Finland, but under a royal decree, the management of Maakalla has been transferred to the local fishermen. Legally, however, the Kallankari Islands does not belong to Finnish self-governing communities or organizations, unlike Åland.

Sights 

 Maakalla Church, an octagonal wooden church built by Simon Silvén from Kalajoki, and a small rectory, both from the 1780s
 Fishing Museum
 Lighthouse island of Ulkokalla

See also 

 Kalajoki Beach

References

External links 
 Maakalla - Visit Kalajoki (in English)
 Kallankarin valtio. Suomen Kuvalehti (n:o 46), 10 November 1934. (in Finnish)
 Suomen vanhin itsehallintoalue Kallankarit unohtui EU:n ulkopuolelle - Yle Elävä arkisto (in Finnish)

Finnish islands in the Baltic
Kalajoki